Pultenaea borea is a species of flowering plant in the family Fabaceae and is endemic to Queensland, Australia. It is an erect shrub with elliptic to linear or egg-shaped leaves and yellow to orange and red flowers.

Description
The upper surface of the leaves is more or less glabrous and the lower surface in densely hairy and grooved. The flowers are arranged in groups with scale-like, reddish bracts.

Taxonomy and naming
Pultenaea borea was first formally described in 2004 by Rogier Petrus Johannes de Kok in Australian Systematic Botany from specimens collected by Anthony Bean near Eidsvold in 1990. The specific epithet (borea) refers to the northern distribution of this species compared to similar pultenaea species.

Distribution and habitat
This pultenaea grows in the understorey of woodland and forest in south-eastern Queensland.

Conservation status
Pultenaea borea is classed as of "least concern" under the Queensland Government Nature Conservation Act 1992.

References

borea
Flora of Queensland
Plants described in 2004